Magdy Tolba  (born 24 February 1964) is a former Egyptian international midfielder.

Tolba spent most of his playing career with Zamalek Sporting Club. He also had a spell with PAOK F.C. in the Greek Super League. Tolba is the first Egyptian to play in the Bulgarian A PFG.

Tolba made several appearances for the Egypt national football team, including participating in the 1990 FIFA World Cup finals.

Titles as a player 
6 for Zamalek
2 Egyptian Leagues
1 Egypt Cup
2 African Champions League
1 Afro-Asian Cup

2 for Levski Sofia
1 Bulgarian League
1 Bulgarian Cup

1 for Anorthosis Famagusta
1 Cypriot First Division

6 for Al-Ahly
3 Egyptian Leagues
1 Arab Champions League
2 Arab Super Cups

References

External links
 

1964 births
Living people
Egyptian footballers
Egypt international footballers
1990 FIFA World Cup players
1992 African Cup of Nations players
1996 African Cup of Nations players
Zamalek SC players
PAOK FC players
PFC Levski Sofia players
Anorthosis Famagusta F.C. players
Ismaily SC players
Super League Greece players
First Professional Football League (Bulgaria) players
Cypriot First Division players
Egyptian expatriate footballers
Expatriate footballers in Greece
Expatriate footballers in Bulgaria
Expatriate footballers in Cyprus
Egyptian expatriate sportspeople in Bulgaria
Egyptian expatriate sportspeople in Cyprus
Egyptian expatriate sportspeople in Greece
Egyptian football managers
Egyptian Premier League players
Association football midfielders